William DeVizia (born November 2, 1969) is an American director, screenwriter, producer, cinematographer, and voice actor. He directed the 1996 film Almost Famous, the 1997 film Lesser Prophets, and produced the 1998 TV movie FashionKingdom. He also was credited in the 2006 video game Bully as the voice over director as well as the voice actor for one of the greaser characters Vance Medici and an Asylum Inmate. He was also the voice over director for the video game Manhunt 2 and a production team member for Rockstar NYC for Grand Theft Auto IV and an additional voice actor.

Filmography

Film

Video games

References

External links
 

Film producers from New Jersey
American male screenwriters
American cinematographers
American male voice actors
American video game producers
American video game directors
American male video game actors
21st-century American male actors
People from Matawan, New Jersey
Film directors from New Jersey
Male actors from New Jersey
Living people
Screenwriters from New Jersey
1969 births
21st-century American screenwriters
21st-century American male writers